Ghost People is the second studio album by Martyn. It was released on Brainfeeder on October 10, 2011. It peaked at number 32 on the UK Dance Albums Chart.

Critical reception 
At Metacritic, which assigns a weighted average score out of 100 to reviews from mainstream critics, the album received an average score of 76 based on 12 reviews, indicating "generally favorable reviews".

Daniel Sylvester of Exclaim! commented that "Martyn has done an excellent job giving each track its own distinctive character". Ben Donnelly of Dusted Magazine described the album as "a dance record unconcerned with pop songs or headphone dynamics". Matthew Bennett of BBC concluded in his review that: "From his eulogy of Detroit strings and deep beats, to London's ambiguous constant reinvention of bass culture, these are tracks that will hold their own in any city with DJs operating at the forefront of the shifting beat."

Track listing

Personnel 
Credits adapted from liner notes.

 Martyn – writing, production
 The Spaceape – vocals (on "Love and Machines")
 Daddy Kev – mastering
 Erosie – cover art
 Mnono.pl – cover photography
 Maria Eisl – portrait photography

Charts

References

External links 
 

2011 albums
Brainfeeder albums
Martyn (musician) albums